Sequim Bay State Park is a public recreation area covering  on the Puget Sound side of the Olympic Peninsula in Clallam County, Washington.

References

External links

Sequim Bay State Park Washington State Parks and Recreation Commission 
Sequim Bay State Park Map Washington State Parks and Recreation Commission

Parks in Clallam County, Washington
State parks of Washington (state)